Gramercy means 'many thanks'.  It is derived from the French term , meaning 'big thanks'.
The term may refer to:

Places in the United States
 Gramercy, Louisiana
 Gramercy Park, a private park and neighborhood in New York City
 Gramercy Park, Los Angeles

Other uses
 Gramercy Books, an imprint of Random House
 The Gramercy Five, a quintet formed by bandleader Artie Shaw
 Gramercy Funds Management, an investment manager dedicated to global emerging markets based in Greenwich, CT.
 Gramercy Mansion, a historic building in Stevenson, Maryland
 Gramercy Pictures, a film studio, currently owned by Focus Features under Universal Pictures
 The Gramercy Residences, a supertall residential building in Makati, Philippines
 The Gramercy, a mixed-use development in the Las Vegas Valley
 Gramercy Tavern, a restaurant in New York City